Rémy Grosso (born 4 December 1988) is a former French professional rugby union player. He played at wing for ASM Clermont Auvergne in the Top 14.

He was a late call up to the French squad for the 2015 Rugby World Cup, replacing the injured Yoann Huget. He subsequently made his debut for France at the tournament and scored a try in the process against Canada.

International tries

References

External links
France profile at FFR
Ligue Nationale De Rugby Profile
European Professional Club Rugby Profile

Living people
1988 births
French rugby union players
Rugby union wings
France international rugby union players